The Travenanzes Formation is a Late Triassic (early Carnian, or early Tuvalian in the regional stratigraphy) limestone, marl and dolomite formation in the Southern Limestone Alps in Trentino-Alto Adige, Italy.

Description 

The Travenanzes Formation is conformably overlain by the Dolomia Principale, and overlies the Heiligkreuz Formation separated by an unconformity. Deposition of the formation took place just after the Carnian Pluvial Event (CPE).

Fossil content 
The following fossils have been described from the Travenanzes Formation:

Ichnofossils

 Atreipus sp.
 Evazoum sp.
 Grallator (Eubrontes)
 Crocodylomorpha indet.

See also 

 List of fossiliferous stratigraphic units in Italy
 Montemarcello Formation
 Schlern Formation
 Wetterstein Formation

References

Bibliography 

    Text and images are available under a  Creative Commons Attribution 4.0 International License
 
 

Geologic formations of Italy
Triassic System of Europe
Triassic Italy
Carnian Stage
Dolomite formations
Limestone formations
Marl formations
Reef deposits
Shallow marine deposits
Ichnofossiliferous formations
Paleontology in Italy
Formations
Geology of the Alps